UDP-glucuronic acid is a sugar used in the creation of polysaccharides and is an intermediate in the biosynthesis of ascorbic acid (except in primates and guinea pigs).

It is made from UDP-glucose by UDP-glucose 6-dehydrogenase (EC 1.1.1.22) using NAD+ as a cofactor. It is the source of the glucuronosyl group in glucuronosyltransferase reactions.

See also
 Glucuronic acid
 UDP

References 

Glucuronide esters
Coenzymes
Nucleotides